Emmanuel Ray is a London-based presenter and human rights activist, most popularly known for his column, Diary of an It Boy.  He won Fashion Icon of the Year 2011 at Fashions Finest Awards UK, and was nominated for London Personality of the Year at London Lifestyle Awards 2012.

Career
Emmanuel has appeared, presented at and reported from a variety of shows including London Fashion Week, Clothes Show Live, Ideal Home Show, Alternative Fashion Week, The Only Way is Essex Christmas special, Made in Chelsea, and various showbiz parties, launch events and fashion shows. He has also hosted media events at the BBC TV Centre and BBC White City and appeared on BBC One, RTÉ, S4C, World Fashion Channel, Fashion TV, Vogue TV, GBC, BBC Asian Network, Brit Asia TV, YGTV, Spectrum FM, SLBC, ITN, E4, ITV, Break London Radio, On FM, Gaydar Radio, and Stonewall Live USA amongst other platforms.

Ray inaugurated Fashion Week Gibraltar in Spring/Summer 2012. In the same year, he reported from Brighton Fashion Week and presented at the annual 46th Botswana Independence Day celebrations in London.

He wrote a society column, Diary of an It Boy, in 2009. The column gave an account of fashion, show business and lifestyle from a man’s perspective. It first appeared in Express Broadcast UK's website, and on Pride Life Magazine. From 2010 onwards, the column appeared on Laissez Faire, a London-based free newspaper focusing exclusively on art and culture. 'Diary of an It Boy' was also the newspaper's only column to appear in print twice, and in five digital publications simultaneously, on a monthly basis; Superstar Magazine, Break London Radio’s website, The Style Column, Work in Fashion, My Kali Mag and kontraPLAN fashion journal.

Activism
Ray has supported human rights and peace campaigns, representing Britain in Los Angeles’s celebrity-led NOH8 Campaign against California Proposition 8 supporting marriage equality, and in the international All Out campaign for against the Ugandan government’s controversial Kill The Gays bill. He was also involved in the Ministry for Peace campaign in British Parliament, 4D for World Peace by Uniting for Peace, and has campaigned for the Ceylon Workers Congress in Sri Lanka, supporting poor manual laborers in the tea plantation sector.

References

External links
 Interview with Britain’s First It Boy – Emmanuel Ray

1980 births
Living people
British socialites